Trigger is a Russian Television series produced by Sreda Film Productions. Starring Maksim Matveyev.

Synopsis 
Artyom is a successful psychologist living in Moscow, preferring the "shock therapy" in his work. Unlike his colleagues, who spend months to listen to the complaints of their clients, Artyom uses various provocations that work until one patient commits suicide...

Cast 
 Maksim Matveyev as Artyom
 Svetlana Ivanova
 Yan Tsapnik

References

External links 
 

Russian drama television series
2020 Russian television series debuts
2020s Russian television series